The Subcommittee on Cybersecurity, Information Technology and Government Innovation is a subcommittee within the U.S. House Oversight Committee. Previously known as the Subcommittee on Information Technology,  the committee was dissolved during the 116th Congress, but revived during the 118th when the House of Representatives returned to Republican Control.

Jurisdiction
The Subcommittee had oversight jurisdiction over federal information technology (IT), data standards and quality, cybersecurity, IT infrastructure and acquisition, emerging technologies, privacy, cloud computing, data centers and intellectual property. In the 116th Congress, it has been dissolved, with its responsibilities handed over to the Subcommittee on Government Operations.

Members, 115th Congress

External links
 Subcommittee webpage

References

Oversight Regulatory Affairs, Stimulus Oversight And Government Spending